This page describe all the 2006 seasons of Formula Renault series.

Formula Renault 3.5L

Formula Renault 2.0L

2006 Formula Renault 2.0 Eurocup season

2006 Championnat de France Formula Renault 2.0 season
Point system : 15, 12, 10, 8, 6, 5, 4, 3, 2, 1 for 10th. In each race 1 point for Fastest lap and 1 for Pole position.

 (R) = Rookies drivers

2006 Formula Renault 2.0 UK season

2006 Formula Renault 2.0 UK Winter Series
The season include 20 rounds. The final standing was established with the best 18 results of the season.
Point system : 32, 28, 25, 22, 20, 18, 16, 14, 12, 11, 10, 9, 8, 7, 6, 5, 4, 3, 2, 1 for 20th. In each race 2 points for Fastest lap.

This table shows final position, including non-MSA licence drivers that were ineligible to make final standing.

 (1) = Points include final positions without non-MSA licence drivers

2006 Formula Renault BARC FR2000 season
The season included 12 rounds in 8 venues. The final standing was established with the best 11 results of the season. A Club Class classification is also established for young drivers (see 2006 Formula Renault BARC Club Class season below), they participated on the same race as the FR2000 series
Point system : 15, 12, 10, 8, 6, 5, 4, 3, 2, 1 for 10th. In each race 1 point for Fastest lap and 1 point for Pole position.

 (1) = Points include only the best 11 results.

2006 Formula Renault BARC Club Class season
The season include 12 rounds. The final standing was established with the best 11 results of the season. The Club Class category is raced in same time as the main Formula Renault BARC FR2000 series. The cars use Tatuus RC (97/98/99) or Mygale SJ99 chassis and are powered by Renault Laguna 2.0L 6 valves engine providing lower Horsepower than the FR2000 class.
 Point system : 15, 12, 10, 8, 6, 5, 4, 3, 2, 1. In each race 1 point for Fastest lap and 1 point for Pole position.

2006 Formula Renault 2.0 Italia season
Point system : 30, 24, 20, 16, 12, 10, 8, 6, 4, 2 for 10th. In each race 2 point for Fastest lap and 2 for Pole position.
Races : 2 race by rounds length of 30 minutes each.

2006 Formula Renault 2.0 Italia Winter Series
Point system : 32, 28, 24, 22, 20, 18, 16, 14, 12, 10, 8, 6, 4, 2, 1 for 15th. In each race 2 point for Fastest lap and 2 for Pole position.
Races : 2 race by rounds length of 30 minutes each.

2006 Formula Renault 2.0 Northern European Cup season

2006 Formule Renault 2.0 Suisse season

2006 PanamGPSeries Formula Renault 2000 de America season
Point system : 30, 24, 20, 16, 12, 10, 8, 6, 4, 2 for 10th. Extra 2 points for Fastest lap and 2 points for Pole position.
The series reward also the best Rookie (N) driver. Citizen-MM-Exxxess win the team championship.

 (1) = Juliana González results doesn't count for championship.

2006 Formula Renault 2.0 Brazil season
This is the last season of the Brazilian Formula Renault series. The series is held on the Renault Speed Show weekends.
Point system : 30, 24, 20, 16, 12, 10, 8, 6, 4, 2 for 10th. 1 point for Pole position and 1 point for Fastest lap.

2006 Formula TR 2000 Pro Series season
The Formula TR 2000 Pro Series is held with the Formula TR 1600 Pro Series. The same point system is used.

2006 Asian Formula Renault Challenge season
Point system : 30, 24, 20, 17, 15, 13, 11, 9, 7, 5, 4, 3, 2, 1 for 14th. No points for Fastest lap or Pole position. Drivers to late involvement don't receive any points for the final standing. The team point attribution is different from the driver point system : 10, 8, 6, 5, 4, 3, 2, 1.
Races : 2 races by rounds.

The China Formula Renault Challenge (C) reward the best driver including only rounds held on China. The table indicate the final position of the race including all drivers and categories but total points are based on results according to participating categories of each driver.

The two first rounds (a and b) are supporting races for the China venue in the 2005–06 A1 Grand Prix Series. These rounds don't rewards any points for the championship. On May 28, the Zhuhai venue held only one of the 2 planned rounds. The cancelled round 5 was held on December 17, as season final round 13.

This table indicate the race original finish positions meanwhile the point standing include only the 10 best results and the eligible point drivers (excluding from results the late involvement driver in the championship).

 (1) = Rounds a and b do not award points.
 (2) = Final standing include only the best 10 results.
 (C) = China Formula Renault Challenge category.

Formula Renault 1.6L

2006 Championnat de France FFSA Formule Campus Renault Elf season
Point system : ?
All drivers use the La Fillière car. The championship is held on various French circuits:
1–2. Circuit Paul Armagnac (April 16–17)
3–4. Circuit de Lédenon (April 29–30)
5–6. Dijon-Prenois (May 20–21)
7–8. Circuit de Pau (June 4–5)
9–10. Circuit du Val de Vienne (June 24–25)
11–12. Circuit Bugatti du Mans (September 30 – October 1)
13–14. Circuit de Nevers Magny-Cours (October 21–22)

2006 Formula Renault 1.6 Belgium season
Each round duration is 20 minutes.
Point system : 20, 17, 15, 13, 11, 10, 9, 8, 7, 6, 5, 4, 3, 2, 1 for 15th. Extra 1 point for Fastest lap and 2 points for Pole position.

2006 Formula Junior 1.6 Italia powered by Renault season
This is the last season of the Formula Junior 1.6 powered by Renault in Italy. In 2007, cars were powered by a Fiat engine and recalled Formula Monza 1.6.
Point system : 20, 17, 15, 13, 11, 10, 9, 8, 7, 6, 5, 4, 3, 2, 1 for 15th. Extra 1 point for Fastest lap and 2 points for Pole position.

2006 Formula Renault 1.6 Argentina season
The 2006 season include 13 venues.
Point system : 20, 15, 12, 10, 8, 6, 4, 3, 2, 1 for 10th. 1 extra point for Pole position. 1 point for start in each race.

2006 PanamGPSeries Formula 1600 Junior season
The PanamGPSeries Formula 1600 Junior is held with the Formula Renault 2000 de America on the same races. The same point system is used.
Point system : 30, 24, 20, 16, 12, 10, 8, 6, 4, 2 for 10th. Extra 2 points for Fastest lap and 2 points for Pole position.

2006 Formula TR 1600 Pro Series season
The Formula TR 1600 Pro Series is held with the Formula TR 2000 Pro Series. The same point system is used.

Other Formulas powered by Renault championships
This section resume unofficial and/or renault engine supplier formulas series.

2006 GP2 Series seasons

The GP2 Series are powered by 4 liters, V8 Renault engine and Bridgestone tyres with a Dallara chassis.

2006 Formula Super Renault season
The series use Dallara, Reynard, Ralt or Toms chassis and Renault 21, 18 or F3R 2.0L engine.
The championship was held on 12 venues:
1. (March 15) Autódromo Roberto Mouras
2. (April 20) Autódromo Roberto Mouras
3. (April ?) Autódromo 9 de Julio
4. (May 1) Autódromo Roberto Mouras
5. (June 22) Autódromo Sudamericano de Olavarría
6. (July 12) Autódromo Roberto Mouras
7. (July ?) Autódromo 9 de Julio
8. (August 7) Autódromo Roberto Mouras
9. (September 4) Autódromo Sudamericano de Olavarría
10. (October 18) Autódromo Roberto Mouras
11. (November ?) Autódromo Roberto Mouras
12. (November ?) Autódromo Roberto Mouras

2006 Fórmula Renault Plus season

2006 Fórmula Renault Interprovencial season

References

External links

Renault
Formula Renault seasons